Constantin Alexandru (15 December 1953 – 10 August 2014) was a light-flyweight Greco-Roman wrestler from Romania who won a silver medal at the 1980 Olympics. He was the world champion in 1978 and 1979 and European champion in 1974–1975 and 1977–1979.

Alexandru took up wrestling at Farul Constanţa, but then moved to CSA Steaua București, where he later worked as a coach. He also trained the national team and served as an international referee.

References

External links 

 
 

1953 births
Olympic wrestlers of Romania
Wrestlers at the 1976 Summer Olympics
Wrestlers at the 1980 Summer Olympics
Romanian male sport wrestlers
Olympic silver medalists for Romania
Olympic medalists in wrestling
2014 deaths
Medalists at the 1980 Summer Olympics
World Wrestling Champions
Universiade medalists in wrestling
Universiade gold medalists for Romania
European Wrestling Champions
World Wrestling Championships medalists
Medalists at the 1977 Summer Universiade